Ministry of Health & Family Welfare may refer to:

 Ministry of Health & Family Welfare (Tripura)
 Ministry of Health & Family Welfare (West Bengal)
 Ministry of Health and Family Welfare (Bangladesh)
 Ministry of Health and Family Welfare, India